Yabucoa is a town and municipality in Puerto Rico located in the eastern region, north of Maunabo; south of San Lorenzo, Las Piedras and Humacao; and east of Patillas. Yabucoa is spread over 9 barrios and Yabucoa Pueblo (the downtown area and the administrative center of the city). It is part of the San Juan-Caguas-Guaynabo Metropolitan Statistical Area.

Etymology and nicknames 
The name Yabucoa is said to come from the Taíno name Guaroca, both a toponymic and personal name meaning "where water [is found]". However this is considered a folk etymology and other linguists suggest the name is most likely a Spanish interpretation of the Taíno word yaucoa (similar to the name Yauco) which means "cassava plantation".

Some nicknames of the city are "Sugar City", after the numerous sugarcane plantations of the Yabucoa Valley, and Pueblo de Yuca ("Yuca Town") which references the Taíno origin of the name of the town. The locals are also known as the Bebe Leches ("milk drinkers") after the numerous dairy farms located in the region.

History
The region of what is now Yabucoa belonged to the Taíno region of Guayaney, which covered a portion of the southeast region of Puerto Rico. The region was led by cacique Guaraca. After the Spanish colonization, the region of Yabucoa belonged to Humacao, and its territory was mostly used for cattle and farming. Yabucoa, as a town, was founded on October 3, 1793, when Don Manuel Colón de Bonilla and his wife, Doña Catalina Morales Pacheco, donated the lands to the people.

Hurricane Maria struck the island of Puerto Rico on September 20, 2017, as a high-end, category 4 hurricane, knocking out power to the entire island and also affected access to clean water. The hurricane made landfall in Camino Nuevo, Yabucoa and triggered numerous landslides, caused widespread flooding and damaged critical infrastructure. Yabucoa's municipal buildings sustained mayor damages, and up to 2500 other structures in Yabucoa were affected.

Elderly were especially affected because many homes were completely destroyed. Many elderly living in Yabucoa died as a result of Hurricane Maria. People on oxygen machines died with the lack of electrical power. In June, 2018 the administrators of the municipality stated that they noticed an uptick in mortality rates (deaths) and were relaying the information since February, of 2018 but the government of Puerto Rico was not interested in hearing about it. Many more deaths were occurring than expected. An entire new section to the cemetery was built following the hurricane and the deaths that followed.

As of June 12, 2018, eight months after the hurricane, more than 30% of Yabucoa homes were still without electrical power, stated the mayor of Yabucoa, Rafael Surillo. He stated there were 4,000 residences with between 12,000 and 15,000 residents without electrical power, of 36,000 residents. Large swaths of Yabucoa municipality including Guayabota, Tejas, Juan Martín, Calabazas, Limones and Aguacate barrios, and 100% of Jácanas were without electrical power for nine months, some since Hurricane Irma had hit a week prior to Hurricane Maria.

Geography
The municipality of Yabucoa is located in the south-eastern coast of Puerto Rico. The Valley of Yabucoa is surrounded by the hills of the San Lorenzo Batholith on three sides and by the Caribbean Sea on the fourth. The hills surrounding the Yabucoa Valley as well as the bedrock underlying the alluvium in the valley are composed of the San Lorenzo Batholith, a large, igneous intrusive body emplaced during the Late Cretaceous (Rogers, 1977; Rogers and others, 1979). The San Lorenzo Batholith is a composite body that is composed of gabbro (Kd), diorite, tonalite, granodiorite, and quartz monzonite. The Cuchillas de Panduras, a fork of the Sierra de Cayey in the Cordillera Central runs through its south. Santa Elena is located in Juan Martin ward. Pandura is located in the Calabazas ward.

Barrios

Like all municipalities of Puerto Rico, Yabucoa is subdivided into barrios.

Aguacate
Calabazas
Camino Nuevo
Guayabota
Jácanas
Juan Martín
Limones
Playa 
Tejas
Yabucoa barrio-pueblo

Sectors

Barrios (which are like minor civil divisions) in turn are further subdivided into smaller local populated place areas/units called sectores (sectors in English). The types of sectores may vary, from normally sector to urbanización to reparto to barriada to residencial, among others.

Special Communities

 (Special Communities of Puerto Rico) are marginalized communities whose citizens are experiencing a certain amount of social exclusion. A map shows these communities occur in nearly every municipality of the commonwealth. Of the 742 places that were on the list in 2014, the following barrios, communities, sectors, or neighborhoods were in Yabucoa: Ingenio, Jacanas Granja, Playa Guayanés, Tejas Trinidad, and Urbanización Jaime C. Rodríguez.

Demographics

Tourism

Landmarks and places of interest
Guayanés Beach and pier
Kyle Rembis beach
Hacienda Santa Lucía Ruins
La Casa de la Cultura (House of Culture)
Roig Refinery
El Cocal Beach, also known as El Guano Beach
Public skatepark
Playa Lucia (Dead Dog Beach)
Petroleum Refinery
Punta Yeguas (and Inés María Mendoza Nature Reserve)

Economy

Agriculture

Yabucoa is known for its agricultural prowess because of the surrounding fertile valley that produces most of the island's plantains and bananas. Yabucoeños are known as "sugar people" because most of the valley was used for sugar cane growth. In addition, one of the most visible landmarks when entering the municipality is the old Hacienda Roig sugar mill, one of the last mills that produced sugar in Puerto Rico.

There's an oil recycling company, the only one in the Caribbean, called Olein Recovery Corp. operating in Yabucoa. During the COVID-19 pandemic Olein began manufacturing hand sanitizer.

Culture

Festivals and events
Yabucoa celebrates its patron saint festival in September / October. The  is a religious and cultural celebration that generally features parades, games, artisans, amusement rides, regional food, and live entertainment.

Other festivals and events celebrated in Yabucoa include:
 Sugar Cane Festival - May
 Beach Festival - May
  – July
  – October
  – December

Sports

 are the Double-A (baseball) team of Yabucoa and have won 4 championships. In 1995 they won against Cidra and in 1996 they won against Cabo Rojo. In 2020,  was the eighth Puerto Rico Double-A baseball team to have won 900 games.

The  where the Azucareros played sustained significant damage from Hurricane Maria in 2017 and as of 2020 the stadium remains in disrepair.

Government

Like all municipalities in Puerto Rico, Yabucoa is administered by a mayor. The current mayor is Rafael Surillo Ruiz, from the Popular Democratic Party (PPD). Surillo was elected at the 2012 general election and won reelected for his third term in 2020 with 65% of the vote.

The city belongs to the Puerto Rico Senatorial district VII, which is represented by two Senators. In 2012, Jorge Suárez and José Luis Dalmau were elected as District Senators. A native of Yabucoa  Ramón Luis Cruz Burgos was elected to represent the city in those elections.

Symbols
The  has an official flag and coat of arms.

Flag
The design of the flag of Yabucoa is abstract, inspired by the colors of the municipal shield; green, white and violet.

Coat of arms
In the shield appear two angels the Santos Angeles Custodios, patron saints of Yabucoa. The color purple (violet) field of the shield represents the highest dignity of the angels. The walking sticks are attributes of the traveller, and refer to the holy office of the Angels as guides and companions in man's journey in his earthly life. The canes are adorned with guajana flowers, representing the wealth of the sugar cane. The green land where the angels stand symbolizes the fertile valley in which Yabucoa is located.

Transportation
One of the main roads to Yabucoa is the PR-3, which borders the east side of the island. Distance from the capital is approximately 1 hour.

In 2008, a tunnel connecting the town of Yabucoa with the town of Maunabo was completed. It is currently the longest on the island.

There are 41 bridges in Yabucoa.

Notable Yabucoeños
 Nydia Velasquez - United States congresswoman
 Carmen Delgado Votaw (1935-2017) - Civil rights activist
 Christian Pagán - Winner of Idol Puerto Rico
 Santiago Vidarte (1828-1848) - Poet
 Antonio Ayuso Valdivieso (1899-1969) - Politician, lawyer, educator
 Jose Facundo Cintrón - Advocated in 1872 and 1873 for the end of slavery.
 Emilio Diaz Colon - member of the military
 Luis Diaz Colon -Politician, mayor of Yabucoa
 Jordan A. Caraballo-Vega - Computer Engineer, NASA

Many residents of Yabucoa have served in the US military service and fought in US wars.

Gallery

See also

List of Puerto Ricans
History of Puerto Rico
Did you know-Puerto Rico?

References

External links
 Yabucoa and its barrios, United States Census Bureau
 
 Puerto Rico Government Directory - Yabucoa
 News of Yabucoa on WALO Radio

 
Municipalities of Puerto Rico
Populated coastal places in Puerto Rico
Populated places established in 1793
San Juan–Caguas–Guaynabo metropolitan area